Local elections were held in Nandi County were held on 4 March 2013. Under the new constitution, which was passed in a 2010 referendum, the 2013 general election was the first where there were election of County governors and their deputies for the 47 newly created counties.  They were also the first general elections run by the Independent Electoral and Boundaries Commission(IEBC) which has released the official list of candidates.

Gubernatorial election

References

 

2013 local elections in Kenya